8 to Abolition is a police and prison abolition resource created during the Black Lives Matter protests of 2020 following the murder of George Floyd.

Formation 
8 to Abolition was created in response to the 8 Can't Wait campaign created by Campaign Zero. The co-authors are Mon Mohapatra, Leila Raven, Nnennaya Amuchie, Reina Sultan, K Agbebiyi , Sarah T. Hamid, Micah Herskind, Derecka Purnell, Eli Dru, and Rachel Kuo.

8 to Abolition states that they believe the 8 Can't Wait campaign is "dangerous and irresponsible, offering a slate of reforms that have already been tried and failed, that mislead a public newly invigorated to the possibilities of police and prison abolition, and that do not reflect the needs of criminalized communities."

Eight points 
The eight points of 8 to Abolition are as follows:

 Defund the police
 Demilitarize communities
 Remove police from schools
 Free people from prisons and jails
 Repeal laws that criminalize survival
 Invest in community self-governance
 Provide safe housing for everyone
 Invest in care, not cops

References

External links 

 Official website

Organizations established in 2020
2020 establishments in the United States
Advocacy groups in the United States
Police abolition movement
Anarchist organizations
Prison abolition movement